Jesús Bracho (1910  1976) was a Mexican art director who designed the sets for over a hundred film productions. The young brother of the film director Julio Bracho, he was active during the Golden Age of Mexican cinema.

Selected filmography
 I'm a Real Mexican (1942)
 Divorced (1943)
 Cantaclaro (1946)
 La mujer de todos (1946)
 Salón México (1949)
 The Woman of the Port (1949)
 Immaculate (1950)
 Women Who Work (1953)
 The Young One (1960)
 My Mother Is Guilty (1960)

References

Bibliography
 Raymond Durgnat. Luis Bunuel. University of California Press, 1977.

External links

1910 births
1976 deaths
Mexican art directors